Martin Faměra (born 4 November 1988 in Vimperk) is a Czech water polo player representing Spain (and formerly Slovakia).

He represented Slovakia in 2016 Men's European Water Polo Championship and Spain in the 2020 Summer Olympics tournament.

References

1988 births
Living people
People from Vimperk
Water polo players at the 2020 Summer Olympics
Czech male water polo players
Olympic water polo players of Spain
Sportspeople from the South Bohemian Region
World Aquatics Championships medalists in water polo